Clark Construction, also referred to as Clark Construction Group, LLC, is a construction firm headquartered in Bethesda, Maryland, and founded in 1906. The company had 2018 annual revenue of more than $5 billion, and is one of the largest commercial and civil contractors in the country.  Some projects include Capital One Arena, and L'Enfant Plaza,

History
The company traces its founding to the George Hyman Construction Company, an excavating company, in 1906. Business boomed, as it initially had the only steam shovel in Washington.  The company began doing construction work in 1923; its first such contract was with Wheatley Junior High School.  The company was involved in numerous military construction projects during World War II.

Hyman died in 1959 and was succeeded by his nephew Benjamin Rome.

In 1969, A. James Clark bought the company from the Hyman family and oversaw major growth including one of its earliest projects L'Enfant Plaza in Washington.  Clark formed a separate company in 1977 for non-union projects in the Washington area (Hyman legally could not bid on such projects). In 1995, Clark merged construction companies of Hyman, Shirley Contracting Company, Guy F. Atkinson Construction and OMNI to form Clark Construction.

In 2016, a year after Clark died, firm management bought the company from its parent Clark Enterprises, leaving the parent to concentrate on its private equity, financial and real estate markets.

Subsidiaries

C3M Power Systems - a transportation systems contractor
Edgemoor Infrastructure & Real Estate - a developer and asset manager of public buildings and infrastructure
Guy F. Atkinson Construction - a heavy civil contractor  
Shirley Contracting Company - a transportation and heavy civil construction services company

References

External links
 

Construction and civil engineering companies of the United States
Companies based in Bethesda, Maryland
Privately held companies based in Maryland
American companies established in 1906
1906 establishments in Maryland